The Slovak Basketball Association also known as SBA is the governing body of basketball in Slovakia. It was founded after the dissolution of Czechoslovakia in 1993. They are headquartered in Bratislava.

The Slovak Basketball Association operates the Slovakia men's national team and Slovakia women's national team. They run national competitions in Slovakia, for both the men's and women's senior teams and also the youth national basketball teams.

The top professional league in Slovakia is the Slovak Basketball League.

See also 
Slovakia men's national basketball team
Slovakia men's national under-20 basketball team
Slovakia men's national under-18 basketball team
Slovakia men's national under-16 basketball team
Slovakia women's national basketball team
Slovakia women's national under-20 basketball team
Slovakia women's national under-18 basketball team
Slovakia women's national under-16 basketball team

References

External links 
Official website 
Slovakia FIBA profile

Basketball
Fed
Basketball governing bodies in Europe
Sports organizations established in 1993